Rye is a seaside town on the Mornington Peninsula in Melbourne, Victoria, Australia, approximately  south-west of Melbourne's Central Business District, located within the Shire of Mornington Peninsula local government area. Rye recorded a population of 9,438 at the 2021 census.

Rye's beach, on the eastern side of Port Phillip, is popular with swimmers, fishermen, yachtsmen, and kitesurfers. Its ocean beach (which is not patrolled) is also popular with surfers and divers. Rye is in the traditional country of the Boon wurrung (Bunurong) people of the Kulin nation.

History

Rye was proclaimed a town on 26 February 1861 and is partly in the parish of Wannaeue but mainly in the parish of Nepean, which is west of Government Road and Weeroona Street. The township went south to the southern boundary of the cemetery, with its east and west boundaries being Weir Street and Dundas Street. Suburban lots of 21 to 98 acres extended west to French St and south to a point just past the Golf Pde corner. Most of these suburban lots were bought by W.A.Blair, a Melbourne Lime Merchant.
He also received grants for much land in the parishes of Wannaeue and Nepean. His objective was to establish a monopoly, which was only rivalled by John Cain. Many who had been engaged in the production of lime, such as Nathan Page, Tom Bennett, Edward Russell, Harold Bainbridge and Spunner, were dispossessed of their kilns by Blair in about 1867. Lime could be quarried throughout the area west of Boneo Road. Many golf courses and the Peninsula Hot Springs are on the sites of Limeburners' properties between Browns and Limestone Roads. An excellent reproduction of a lime kiln can be seen on the foreshore just east of White Cliff. They were built into the side of a hill so that firewood and napped limestone could be loaded from above.

Demand for Rye lime slackened in 1879 because of the opening of the Lilydale quarry but the Sullivans continued production south of Weeroona Road, later managed by Antonio Albress, and Blair's big kiln still operated on the Fire Station site. Ben Stenniken and James Sullivan became the leaders in a new industry, firewood. Ti tree had spread inland from the foreshore as the she-oaks had almost completely disappeared, having fired the kilns for decades. Cut into 2 foot 6 inch sections, the ti tree was shipped in former limecraft to heat bakers' ovens in Melbourne. 
Jim Brown and the Jennings family moved into farms near Browns Road just before and after 1910, the latter on former Blair land. Brown set about dealing with rampant ti tree and rabbits, while the Jennings family moved into dairy farming. Another feature on land granted to Blair was the McDonalds' Rye Golf Links, enclosed by Dundas Street and Golf Parade. (Sources: Parish and Rye Township maps, Lime Land Leisure.)
More details are available on the Rye Historical Society website.
(www.ryehistoricalsociety.weebly.com/index.html) The Post Office opened on 18 January 1858 as Tootgarook and was renamed Rye in 1870.

Today

The town has a Lions Club and a Community Action Group which operates a Community Website to promote the town (www.rye.vic.au) In 2010 the Rotary Club merged with the Rosebud Rotary Club. These organisations are heavily involved within the local community. 
Rye also has a historical society which operates from the Old School House in Collingwood Street. 
Rye's summer carnival is located beside the pier carpark.  The town is extremely popular during vacation periods and has a varied selection of eating establishments.

The town has an Australian Rules football team competing in the Mornington Peninsula Nepean Football League.

Golfers play at the course of the Moonah Links on Peter Thomson Drive or at The Dunes Golf Links on Browns Road.

When it opened in 2004, Rye Skatepark was the first cradle skate bowl built in the Southern Hemisphere. It remains popular with skateboarders.

Rye Pier

Rye Pier is a popular recreational scuba diving shore dive site inside Port Phillip. The pier can house seahorses, stingrays, spider crabs, squid, scallops and octopuses and Australian fur seals. The wreck of the wooden sailing ketch Eivion lies 115 metres to the east of Rye Pier. The shipwreck remains of the wooden schooner Barbara lie 240 metres to the west of Rye Pier.

Rye Pier is also the location of an annual giant spider crab mass aggregation. In late May-June great spider crabs migrate along through the area.

Fire Brigade

The Rye Fire Brigade is located in Collingwood Street, just behind the Bowls Club.
The brigade has 3 appliances, a Pumper – used for structure fires, and Tanker – used for grass and scrub fires, and a Salvage – used as a support for both pumper and tanker.

The fire brigade is volunteer-based and responds to calls in the Rye area and surrounding areas. Rye Brigade played important roles during Black Saturday sending trucks to Narre Warren, Kinglake, Longwarry and sending crews to Wilson Promontory.

See also
 Shire of Flinders – Rye was previously within this former local government area.

References

Suburbs of Melbourne
Suburbs of the Shire of Mornington Peninsula